Warthill is a village and civil parish in the Ryedale district of North Yorkshire, England, six miles north-east of York and 14 miles south-west of Malton.

The village has one public house, The Agar Arms, and a Church of England primary school (established in 1863), with about forty pupils.

Warthill is home to St Mary's Church, which was built in the 19th century and is a good example of Victorian Gothic architecture.

Brockfield Hall, a Georgian house completed in 1807, is situated nearby. It was built for Benjamin Agar by Peter Atkinson senior who worked in the office of  John Carr (architect). Brockfield has an oval entry hall with cantilevered staircase. The house displays fine art and furniture, and mementos associated with the Fitzalan Howard family. There is also an unusual collection of glass walking sticks.

The house is rectangular in plan, with a hipped slate roof. The most immediately noticeable feature is a large Venetian window on the first floor which is set in a semi-circular arch of stone panels. Below is an ironwork balcony with stands above the entry porch. The interior serves partly as a display space for paintings by the Staithes group of artists.

The hall is now designated as a Grade II* listed building.

Railway
Warthill was served by Warthill railway station which was on the York to Beverley Line between 1847 and 1959.

References

External links 

 Warthill Church of England (VC) Primary School website
 

Villages in North Yorkshire
Civil parishes in North Yorkshire